Namig Abasli (born 12 September 1997) is an Azerbaijani Paralympic judoka. He won one of the bronze medals in the men's 66 kg event at the 2020 Summer Paralympics held in Tokyo, Japan.

References 

Living people
1997 births
Azerbaijani male judoka
Paralympic judoka of Azerbaijan
Paralympic bronze medalists for Azerbaijan
Paralympic medalists in judo
Judoka at the 2020 Summer Paralympics
Medalists at the 2020 Summer Paralympics
Place of birth missing (living people)
21st-century Azerbaijani people